Aldo Beckman (c. 1934 – September 10, 1980) was an American journalist for the Chicago Tribune from 1959 to his death, and the president of the White House Correspondents' Association in 1978–1979.

Life
Beckman was born in Lima, Illinois circa 1934. He attended Bradley University, and he graduated from Western Illinois University.

Beckman joined the Chicago Tribune as a court reporter in 1959. He joined their Washington, D.C. bureau in 1965 and eventually became the bureau chief. He won the Edward Scott Beck in 1966 and 1972, and he served as the president of the White House Correspondents' Association in 1978–1979.

Beckman married Marijo Walsh. They had a son and four daughters, and they resided in Arlington, Virginia. Beckman died of cancer on September 10, 1980, in Arlington, at age 45. The Aldo Beckman Memorial Award was named in his honor.

References

1930s births
1980 deaths
People from Adams County, Illinois
People from Arlington County, Virginia
Bradley University alumni
Western Illinois University alumni
Journalists from Illinois
Chicago Tribune people
Deaths from cancer in Virginia
20th-century American journalists
American male journalists